The Anvil Hill Coal Mine now known as the Mangoola Open Cut or Mangoola Coal  was proposed in the upper Hunter Valley in New South Wales in the 2000s. There was strong support for and against the coal mine within the Hunter Valley and other areas. The coal mine was to be managed by Centennial Coal with Mmnes operator expected to be Thiess. The mine provides coal mostly for the production of electricity. It currently has contracts for providing coal to Bayswater / Liddell power stations in the Upper Hunter for 12 years, commencing in 2008.

Pros and cons
Supporters state that the local communities exist because of mining historically attracting workers to the area and that a new mine will lead to further employment in the local area along with statewide economic benefit.
Environmental activists have utilised arguments against removing current landholders, potential loss of flora and fauna diversity and climate change to argue against the mines approval.

History of approval
The proposed mine EA (environmental assessment) was provided to the Department of Planning in June 2006.  On 7 June the NSW Planning Minister Frank Sartor approved the proposed mine, stating that not going ahead with the mine would make no overall difference to climate change and thus would slow down the economy of New South Wales without good reason. Additionally many local landowners where happy to accept Centennial Coals purchase offer, and further environmental surveys showed species were found in greater abundance, further afield, than protestors had stated was the case.

That same year, however, the Land and Environment Court of New South Wales found, in a case initiated by environmentalist Pete Gray, that the government had failed to properly assess the greenhouse gas pollution that would be caused by the mining and subsequent use of the coal. This was described by Greenpeace as a "landmark case [...] that forced tougher scrutiny of coal mine emissions in Australia".

Sale to Xstrata
Centennial Coal announced the sale of its Anvil Hill mine to Xstrata for $425 million on 17 September 2007

Xstrata Coal is seen by certain politicians as a respectable coal mine operator within the NSW and QLD communities, with former Premier of NSW Bob Carr saying in regards to the Xstrata Coal scholarships program "Xstrata Coal’s commitment to the teacher’s scholarships is an outstanding example of good corporate citizenship in action. They have provided teachers with valuable new experiences to strengthen their professional knowledge and teaching ability. This is a direct contribution to the well being of the community in which they operate. This means teachers in NSW can be equipped with new skills that will touch the lives of hundreds of their students down the years

Xstrata is also seen in a better position to undertake the operation of Anvil Hill, which is reflected in the statements made by Centinneal Coals Managing Director Robert Cameron, who said Xstrata was better placed to "absorb" the risks involved in the development of the Anvil Hill project.

See also 

 Coal Mining in Australia
 Energy policy of Australia

References

External links
 Anvil Hill Project - Centennial Coal Company
 Xstrata Coal - Group information
 Anvil Hill Alliance - Save Anvil Hill

Coal mines in New South Wales
Surface mines in Australia
Xstrata